Actinocleidus is a genus of monogeneans belonging to the family Ancyrocephalidae. 
All members of the genus are parasitic on fish.

Species

The following species are considered valid according to WorRMS: 

 Actinocleidus articularis (Mizelle, 1936) Mueller, 1937 
 Actinocleidus bennetti Allison & Rogers, 1970
 Actinocleidus bifidus Mizelle & Cronin, 1943
 Actinocleidus brevicirrus Mizelle & Jaskoski, 1942
 Actinocleidus cruciatus (Wedl, 1858)
 Actinocleidus fergusoni Mizelle, 1938
 Actinocleidus georgiensis Price, 1966
 Actinocleidus leiognathi Tripathi, 1959
 Actinocleidus oculatus (Mueller, 1934) Mueller, 1937
 Actinocleidus recurvatus Mizelle & Donahue, 1944
A number of other species are considered taxa inquirenda by WorMs.

References

Ancyrocephalidae
Monogenea genera